Mochtín is a municipality and village in Klatovy District in the Plzeň Region of the Czech Republic. It has about 1,100 inhabitants.

Administrative parts

Villages and hamlets of Bystré, Hoštice, Hoštičky, Kocourov, Lhůta, Nový Čestín, Srbice, Těšetiny and Újezdec are administrative parts of Mochtín.

References

Villages in Klatovy District